Neighbourhoods of Seoul are not governmental administrative divisions, but rather more informal area designations, often surrounding a particular landmark, such as a road, a university, or a gate of the old city.

Names are listed in Hangul and Hanja.

Apgujeong (압구정 )
Bukchon Hanok Village (북촌 한옥마을  마을)
Cartoon Street (카툰 거리)
COEX Mall
Cheongdam-dong (청담동 )
Daehangno (대학로 )
Dongdaemun (동대문 )
Gangnam (강남 )
Guryong
Hongdae (홍대 )
Idae (이대 )
Ihwa Mural Village (이화 벽화마을)
Insadong (인사동 )
Itaewon (이태원 )
Jongno (종로 )
Myeongdong (명동 )
Namdaemun (남대문 )
Seorae Village (서래마을 마을)
Seoul Station (서울역 서울)
Sillim (신림 )
Sincheon (신천 )
Sinchon (신촌 )
Teheranno (테헤란로)
Yeouido (여의도 )

 
Seoul
Seoul
Neighbourhoods